Innocent Sorcerers is a 1960 Polish psychological romantic drama film directed by Andrzej Wajda, and starring Tadeusz Łomnicki and Krystyna Stypułkowska. Its plot follows a young doctor and jazz drummer meeting a mysterious girl, who all but forces herself into his apartment where they talk of morals and love.

The film was appreciated with Diploma of Merit at the Edinburgh International Film Festival in 1961. In Poland however, after its premiere Innocent Sorcerers met with criticism from both the then communist authorities and the Catholic Church. Nevertheless, since its release the film has garnered acclaim from film critics and audience, similar to its worldwide reception to date. American filmmaker Martin Scorsese recognized the film as one of the masterpieces of Polish cinema and in 2013 he selected it for screening in the United States, Canada and United Kingdom as part of the Martin Scorsese Presents: Masterpieces of Polish Cinema festival of Polish films.

Plot 
A young blond-haired man, having washed himself, listens to his recorded conversations with various girls he was having affairs with, while one of them, Mirka unsuccessfully tries to get to his apartment. As he waits for her to go, his friend Edmund comes. He drives him to the sports venue, where we learn that the still unnamed main protagonist is a doctor who qualifies young men for participation in the boxing tournament. He meets there his ex-lover and nurse – Teresa. In the evening, he plays drums in a jazz band led by a bassist Dudek "Polo". The group takes part in a music competition, heavily attended by many young people, including Mirka. After the successful performance (still described by Dudek as "crap" and "fairground music"), he flirts with a journalist. Seeing this, Mirka leaves the place sadly.

Later that evening he meets with Edmund at the club, where infatuated by the charm of a young girl Edmund wants to get rid of her partner by driving him out of the city, pretending to be a taxi driver. Doing that, the main protagonist's task would be to take the girl back to the club, where they would wait for Edmund to join them. However, the plan fails when the "kidnapped" girl makes the protagonist go for a night walk around Warsaw with her. He feels sorry for her so he tries to help her catch the train back home. The girl, however, being in no hurry, missed the train on purpose. Feeling confused and guilty, he takes her to his apartment.

Apparently attracted to each other, they write down a "contract" dedicated to their acquaintance. Introducing themselves with made-up names (she says her name is "Pelagia", while he introduces himself as "Bazyli") they make fun of the social norms imposed on people by society as well as the very situation in which they both found themselves. Throughout the night, Bazyli and Pelagia perform all sorts of non-sexual activities, such as chatting and playing all kind of social games, finally falling asleep on separate beds.

In the morning, Bazyli's bandmates wake him up to go outside. He comes out of his apartment to greet them, leaving Pelagia alone. When he returns, Bazyli finds out she's no longer there. Desperately looking for his newly met girlfriend, he comes again to the sports venue, where he hopelessly asks Edmund if he knows anything about her. Edmund, confused by seeing his friend being in love, calls the main protagonist for the first time by his real name – "Andrzej". As he leaves the place, Andrzej is attacked by a boxer who resents the doctor for not allowing him to start in the tournament. However, Andrzej defeats him and slowly returns to his apartment.

As the resigned protagonist opens the door, he is surprised to see delighted Pelagia offering him tea and telling him she went for a walk. Tired Andrzej, acting as if nothing serious happened, goes to sleep. In that very moment, hearing on the radio what time is it, the girl sadly announces she has to go. Andrzej doesn't stop her. She leaves the apartment but after a short thought, before even going downstairs, she returns to it.

Cast

Production

Development and pre-production 

After the failure of his previous film Lotna, Andrzej Wajda intended to make a film devoted to contemporary topics, which he personally defined years later as "one of the few politically neutral works he had made." The idea to create Innocent Sorcerers was inspired by the rapid spread of jazz culture in Cold War-era Poland, especially motivated by the activities of the jazz bands led by Krzysztof Komeda. The screenplay for the film was written by a 50-year-old at that time writer Jerzy Andrzejewski and future international filmmaker Jerzy Skolimowski. Both of them were well acquainted with the life of young people fascinated by jazz. Andrzejewski's goal was to show the nascent phenomenon of "social egoism" among young people. He borrowed the title of the film from a line in Adam Mickiewicz's poetic drama Dziady, Part I:

We've nothing to busy us with? From man's earliest age,
Such seclusion's been sought out by the fervent sage
Intent on finding wealth, medicinal balm,
Or poison... We, young innocent sorcerers let us test the scope
Of our talents - to find poison for our hope.

Andrzejewski was primarily responsible for the film's dialogues, while the rest of the script was handled by Skolimowski. Both of them worked on the script for two weeks. On May 5, 1959, a meeting of the Script Evaluation Committee was held, at which the artistic director of the Kadr Film Studio – Tadeusz Konwicki, personally supported the project, convincing the deputy minister of culture and arts, who wasn't sure if he should consent the start of production. Aleksander Ścibor-Rylski also expressed his enthusiasm for the project, claiming that "young people need to watch this film because it shows the danger of the masking."

Casting and filming 

As far as Wajda was concerned, as for someone who was unfamiliar with social life and clumsy in observing "everyday social changes," the production of Innocent Sorcerers caused considerable difficulties. The director chose Tadeusz Łomnicki for the role of the main character, bearing in mind their long-term collaboration. Łomnicki wanted his character to look similar to Krzysztof Komeda, achiving it by bleaching his hair and changing his hairstyle. In addition, he learned how to play a drum solo, which he actually performed during filming the jazz concert sequence, though it was ultimately overdubbed. The actor prepared his lines of dialogue well in advance of the filming period. However, according to Wajda, Łomnicki was acting in the film "too much as if it was a play." The role of Magda was given to Krystyna Stypułkowska, who, with Wajda's consent, changed some of her lines. She recalled later, that "in the script, the girl was quite unpleasant. She was constantly yelling, screaming, and being aggressive in general. It didn't suit me."

Wajda later regretted that he had cast Łomnicki and Stypułkowska in the lead roles instead of Elżbieta Czyżewska and Skolimowski, the screenwriter for the film himself. The latter was given a minor role as a boxer, which Skolimowski performed very rigorously – the short fight scene was not simulated, and from Skolimowski's eyebrow flowed his actual blood. Edmund was played by often referred to as "Polish James Dean" – Zbigniew Cybulski, whom Wajda considered one of the best Polish actors of all time. Additionally, future international filmmaker Roman Polanski starred as the leader of the jazz band, Dudek "Polo".

The film was shot throughout the summer of 1959 in Warsaw. Among the exact filming locations were Constitution Square, the backyard at 10 Chmielna Street, Old Town Market Place, and Warszawa Śródmieście railway station. At the final technical inspection and the pre-release screening of a film, the commission demanded the removal of the pessimistic ending, in which Andrzej and Magda parted forever. Only after adding a happy ending, the film was sent for distribution on December 17, 1960.

Music 
The jazz score for Innocent Sorcerers was composed by Krzysztof Komeda, making it the second feature to contain his music. The composer, already famous musician in Poland at that time, both took part in the recording of the soundtrack and played fictionalized version of himself in the film in a cameo role.
In 2014, British label Jazz On Film Records issued full score for the film for the first time as part of the 4-CD deluxe box set of remastered original soundtracks by Komeda and Andrzej Trzaskowski including previously unissued recordings remastered from the original analogue tapes.
Released soundtrack features tracks as follow:

Reception

Critical response 
On its release in communist-ruled Poland, the film received mixed reviews from critics. A vicious attack on the work of Wajda, Skolimowski and Andrzejewski was launched by Janusz Wilhelmi from the communist propaganda newspaper Trybuna Ludu, accusing the creators of portraying "extremely limited beings, without real human passions and real human interests" and promoting values in the categories of "social harmfulness." Jerzy Płażewski, writing for Przegląd Kulturalny, expressed a more distant opinion. According to him, Wajda "having humbly abandoned the position of creator-demiurge, does not pretend to be smarter than his characters," and the film itself (compared by the critic to the films of Federico Fellini) was "born out of pity" for its characters. Stefan Morawski, in his review for the magazine Ekran, considered the film "socially useful, showing the bankruptcy of the life attitude represented here." However, he criticized the ending that he considered weakened the accusatory message of Innocent Sorcerers.

While Polish reviews drew attention to the controversial portrayal of young people, the film received a whole different reception abroad with the Telegraph calling it "cool, smart and brilliant." Robert Vas writing for the Sight and Sound stated that "the director shows his antiheroes as amiable, innocent, rebellious victims of a universal mood, suffused with the fallout of fear and nihilism." Il Globo noted that this way of telling stories about ordinary people "in the countries behind the Iron Curtain had so far been rare." Pierre Lefebur, in his review for the Belgian La Cité, appreciated the acting and staging, stating that Innocent Sorcerers are "more convincing, even more dazzling, than the chaotic sketches made by young French filmmakers." Louis Seguin wrote for the Positif magazine that "by watching Innocent Sorcerers, you will receive a cinema lesson."

Innocent Sorcerers was condemned by the Catholic Church. In January of 1961, Wajda received a letter from the Archdiocese of Warsaw which pointed out that the film "by revealing the problem, shows its complete helplessness when it comes to practical educational guidelines and thus seems completely inappropriate for the youth it shows." Above all, the film was criticized by the communist authorities by stating that "Innocent Sorcerers proclaimed the lack of any healthy ambitions and goals."

Contemporary reviews 
In later film analyses, attempts were made to link the film with the hypothetical phenomenon of the Polish New Wave, which was supposed to be evidenced not so much by the generational community of Wajda, Skolimowski and Polanski, but by the motif of the youth's love initiation and the complete omission of the war theme – the main theme of the classic Polish Film School. 

Ben Sachs of the Chicago Reader magazine stated: "The film serves as a fascinating document of Polish youth culture during the least repressive years of the communist era, as well as a rough draft for the freewheeling comedies Skolimowski would soon direct himself." Jerzy Płażewski, reviewing Innocent Sorcerers years later wrote that "Wajda's effective direction gracefully oscillated between a subtle mockery of the characters and heartfelt sympathy for them." According to Tadeusz Lubelski, "despite the imposed happy ending, the film still functions as a moral testimony of that era."

On Rotten Tomatoes, the film has an approval rating of 100% based on 4 reviews, with an average rating of 4.3/5.

See also 
 Cinema of Poland
 List of Polish films of the 1960s

References

Notes

External links 
 Innocent Sorcerers – Full Film
 
 Innocent Sorcerers – Andrzej Wajda at Culture.pl

1960 films
Films directed by Andrzej Wajda
Films scored by Krzysztof Komeda
Films with screenplays by Jerzy Skolimowski
1960s Polish-language films
Polish black-and-white films
1960s psychological drama films
1960 romantic drama films
Polish romantic drama films